Petar Hristov Merkov (born 3 November 1976 in Plovdiv) is a Bulgarian sprint canoeist who competed in the late 1990s and early 2000s (decade). Competing in three Summer Olympics, he who won two silver medals at Sydney in 2000 (K-1 500 m, K-1 1000 m). Prior to those games, Merkov was subjected to controversy for failing a doping test in Bulgaria which led to over a dozen canoeing nations petitioning the International Canoe Federation for an investigation, only to have Bulgarian officials stonewall on his behalf to compete. He would later refuse to attend the post-race press conference of K-1 1000 m in the wake of those allegations.

Merkov was K-1 500 m European champion in 1999.

At the ICF Canoe Sprint World Championships, Merkov won silver medals in the K-1 500 m event in 1999 and 2002. In 2002, he also won a bronze in K-4 1000 m.

Merkov is 188 cm (6'2") tall and weighs 95 kg (209 lbs). He is currently a member of the Levski Canoe/Kayak Club in Sofia.

References

Sports-reference.com profile
Wallechinsky, David and Jaime Loucky (2008). The Complete Book of the Olympics: 2008 Edition, London: Aurum Press Limited. pp. 470, 473.

1976 births
Bulgarian male canoeists
Bulgarian sportspeople in doping cases
Canoeists at the 1996 Summer Olympics
Canoeists at the 2000 Summer Olympics
Canoeists at the 2004 Summer Olympics
Doping cases in canoeing
Living people
Olympic canoeists of Bulgaria
Olympic silver medalists for Bulgaria
Olympic medalists in canoeing
ICF Canoe Sprint World Championships medalists in kayak
Medalists at the 2000 Summer Olympics